Ağayrı (also, Ağəyri, Ağayri, and Agayry) is a village and municipality in the Bilasuvar Rayon of Azerbaijan.  It has a population of 2,187.

References 

Populated places in Bilasuvar District